Pont-Saint-Vincent is a commune in the Meurthe-et-Moselle department in north-eastern France.

Geography
The river Madon flows into the Moselle in the commune.

See also
Communes of the Meurthe-et-Moselle department

References

Pontsaintvincent